The 2009 FINA Swimming World Cup was a series of five short course (25 m) swimming meets, held in October and November 2009.

Meets
The 2009 World Cup was staged at five venues on three continents, with each meet following a morning heats and evening finals format for all events, with the exception of the 800 m and 1500 m freestyle and 400 m individual medley events which were heat-declared winners. The order of events at each meet was the same. A sixth meet originally scheduled to be held in Rio de Janeiro, Brazil on 23–25 October was cancelled.

Results

Overall World Cup
At each meet of the World Cup circuit in 2009, the FINA Points Table was used to rank all swim performances at the meet. The top 10 men and top 10 women were then be awarded World Cup points. Bonus points were awarded for a world record broken (20 points) or equalled (10 points). The number of World Cup points awarded was doubled for the final meet of the World Cup in Singapore.

The overall rankings are shown below.

Men

Women

Event winners

50 m freestyle

100 m freestyle

200 m freestyle

400 m freestyle

1500 m (men) / 800 m (women) freestyle

50 m backstroke

100 m backstroke

200 m backstroke

50 m breaststroke

* Jessica Hardy set a new world record of 28.96 seconds in the heats of this event in Stockholm.

100 m breaststroke

200 m breaststroke

* Neil Versfeld set a new World Cup record of 2:02.56 seconds in the heats of this event in Berlin.

50 m butterfly

100 m butterfly

200 m butterfly

100 m individual medley

* Therese Alshammar set a new world record of 58.51 seconds in the heats of this event in Durban. 
** Sergey Fesikov set a new world record of 50.95 seconds in the heats of this event in Berlin.

200 m individual medley

400 m individual medley

Legend:

See also
List of World Cup records in swimming

References

External links
FINA/ARENA Swimming World Cup 2009 official site

FINA Swimming World Cup
Fina Swimming World Cup, 2009